Federal Route 91, or Jalan Kluang-Kota Tinggi, is the main federal road in Johor, Malaysia. It connects Kluang to Kota Tinggi.

Route background 
The route starts at Kluang and ends at Kota Tinggi via Gunung Lambak and Bandar Tenggera.

Features

At most sections, the Federal Route 91 was built under the JKR R5 road standard, allowing maximum speed limit of up to 90 km/h.

List of intersections and towns
 I/S - intersection RSA - Rest and service area, L/B - layby, BR - bridge

References

091